This is a list of archaeological and artistic sites of Sardinia, Italy:

Acquafredda near Siliqua, castle, 13th century
Aiodda near Nurallao-Nuragus, Giants' Tomb
Albucciu near Olbia-Arzachena, nuraghe
Alghero 
Anghelu Ruju near Alghero Ozieri, necropolis
Antas near Fluminimaggiore, temple
Ardara, Romanesque church of Santa Maria del Regno
Argentiera carbon mines, ghost villages, industrial architecture
Asoru near Muravera, nuraghe
Arrubiu
Assemini Catalan Gothic church, 16th century, Byzantine oratorio, 10th century
Barumini nuragic palace and village (*Su Nuraxi), Catalan church 15th century, Catalan Gothic villa
Benetutti church, 15th century, paintings
Biristeddi Giants Tomb
Bisarcio Romanesque church
Bonarcado church 11th century
Bonorva nuragic temple, nuragic tombs, Carthaginian fort, medieval village, church 16th century
Bonu Ighinu, cave
Borore
Bosa
Brodu
Bulzi
Burghidu, nuraghe
Cabu Abbas
Cagliari
Cala Domestica
Campu Luntanu
Carbonia
Castelsardo
Coddu Vecchiu, Giants Tomb
Cornus
Dolianova
Domu de Orgia
Domu s Orku
Friarosu
Fonte e Mola
Funtana Cuverta
Genna Maria
Genna Salixi
Genoni
Gergei
Gesturi
Golgo
Gonnostramatza
Iglesias
Is Concias
Is Paras, nuraghe
Izzana, nuraghe
Kukkuru Nuraxi
Laconi
Li Muri
Losa, nuraghe
Lugherras, nuraghe
Macomer
Madau
Mandra Antine
Massama
Milis
Molafa
Monte Arci
Monte d'Accoddi
Monte Sirai A fortified hilltop town founded in the 8th century BC
Montessu
Montevecchio
Moseddu
Nora
Nugoro
Nuxis
Olbia, church of San Simplicio (Olbia)
Oliena
Olmedo
Olzai
Oristano
Orolo, nuraghe
Ossi
Ottana
Ozieri
Palmavera
Pani Loriga
Perfugas
Ploaghe
Porto Torres
Pranu Mutteddu
Quirra
Roccia dell Elefante
Saccargia
Sa Coveccada, dolmen
San Cosimo
San Giovanni di Sinis
San Mauro
San Platano
San Salvatore
Sant Antioco
Santa Cristina di Paulilatino
Santa Giusta, ex-Cathedral of Santa Giusta
Santa Vittoria
Santu Antine Nuraghe
Sa Punta e su Nurake
Sardara
Sas Concas
Sassari
Sa Testa
Seneghe
Serra Orrios
Seruci
Sibiola
Silanus
Sorradile
Sorres
Sos Furrighesos
Suelli
Sulci, Phoenician city, Carthaginian necropolis, Roman ruins
Su Mulinu
Su Pranu
Su Tempiesu
Tamuli
Tergu, church of Nostra Signora di Tergu
Tharros
Thiesi
Thomes
Tiscali
Tratalias
Trullas
Tuili
Tuvixeddu necropolis Carthaginian and later Roman necropolis
Uta
Villamar
Zuri

External links 
 Archaeology and short history of Sardinia
 Archaeology and monuments of Sardinia

Sardinia
Archaeological sites in Italy
Archaeological and artistic sites

Archaeology of Sardinia
Archaeological and artistic sites